South Carolina Highway 182 (SC 182) is a  state highway in the U.S. state of South Carolina. The highway connects Fair Play and Oakway.

Route description
SC 182 begins at an intersection with SC 59 and SC 243 (Fair Play Boulevard) in Fair Play, within Oconee County. It travels to the west-southwest and almost immediately curves to the north-northwest. The highway curves to the northeast and enters Oakway. Just before passing the Oakway Intermediate School, it curves to the northwest. A short distance later, it meets its northern terminus, an intersection with SC 24 (West Oak Highway).

Major intersections

See also

References

External links

SC 182 at Virginia Highways' South Carolina Highways Annex

182
Transportation in Oconee County, South Carolina